The 1956–57 season was the 34th season of competitive association football and 27th season in the Football League played by York City Football Club, a professional football club based in York, Yorkshire, England. They finished in seventh position in the 24-team 1956–57 Football League Third Division North. They entered the 1956–57 FA Cup in the first round and lost in the second to Hull City.

21 players made at least one appearance in nationally organised first-team competition, and there were nine different goalscorers. Goalkeeper Tommy Forgan and forward Peter Wragg played in all 49 first-team matches over the season. Arthur Bottom finished as leading goalscorer with 22 goals, of which 21 came in league competition and one came in the FA Cup.

Match details

Football League Third Division North

League table (part)

FA Cup

Appearances and goals
Players with names struck through and marked  left the club during the playing season.
Key to positions: GK – Goalkeeper; FB – Full back; HB – Half back; FW – Forward

See also
List of York City F.C. seasons

References
General

Source for kit: 
Source for match dates, league positions and results: 
Source for appearances, goalscorers and attendances: 
Source for player details: 

Specific

1956–57
English football clubs 1956–57 season
Foot